Islam Dugushiev (born 15 April 1966) is an Azerbaijani former wrestler who competed in the 1992 Summer Olympics and in the 2000 Summer Olympics.

References

External links
 

1966 births
Living people
Olympic wrestlers of the Unified Team
Olympic wrestlers of Azerbaijan
Wrestlers at the 1992 Summer Olympics
Wrestlers at the 2000 Summer Olympics
Azerbaijani male sport wrestlers
Olympic silver medalists for the Unified Team
Olympic medalists in wrestling
World Wrestling Championships medalists
Medalists at the 1992 Summer Olympics
20th-century Azerbaijani people
21st-century Azerbaijani people